Deary can refer to:

People
 Ian Deary, psychologist
 John Deary, English footballer
 Terry Deary, children's author
 Peter Deary, English musician

Places
 Deary, Idaho, United States